Cleaning Up may refer to:
 Cleaning Up (British TV series), a British television drama series
 "Cleaning Up" (The Wire), an episode of the TV series, The Wire
 Cleaning Up (South Korean TV series), a 2022 South Korean TV series
 Cleaning Up (1925 film), an American comedy film directed by Fatty Arbuckle
 Cleaning Up (1933 film), a British comedy film